Omota is a small settlement in the Municipality of Semič in Slovenia. It lies northeast of Semič, just off the local road to Gradnik. The area is part of the historical region of Lower Carniola. The municipality is now included in the Southeast Slovenia Statistical Region.

References

External links
Omota at Geopedia

Populated places in the Municipality of Semič